The 1996 European Rugby League Championship was the second and last championship of the 1990s. After England won the tournament, it was not played again until 2003

Game 1

Game 2

Game 3

Final standings

References

European Nations Cup
European rugby league championship
International rugby league competitions hosted by the United Kingdom
International rugby league competitions hosted by France
1996 in French rugby league
1996 in Welsh rugby league